Sir Henry Thomas Gott (c. 1710 – 14 November 1809), born Henry Thomas Greening was the son of Thomas Greening (died February 1757), gardener to King George II. Thomas (died September 1757) had held royal contracts from the 1720s onward. Henry Thomas Greening inherited the nursery garden.

In 1769, Henry Greening changed his surname to Gott, as directed by the terms of the will of his cousin Mary Gott of Streat, Sussex. He was knighted in 1774.

His daughter Sarah married first Robert Whitcombe of The Whittern, Lyonshall, and secondly Sir Harford Jones Brydges, 1st Baronet. Sarah's mother and the mothers of both of her husbands, were sisters, the daughters of Richard Hooper of Lyonshall.

References

External links
 Richard Hodgson http://www.ancestorsearch.co.uk
 

1730 births
1809 deaths
British gardeners
Knights Bachelor